Charles Edward Waller (September 1832 – 9 March 1886) was an English first-class cricketer.

The son of the Reverend Charles Waller, Sr., he was born at Trimley St. Mary in September 1832. He was educated at Marlborough College, before going up to Emmanuel College, Cambridge in 1851. He made his debut in first-class cricket for the Surrey Club against the Marylebone Cricket Club (MCC) at Lord's in 1855. He made a further first-class appearance for the Surrey Club in 1858, also against the MCC. He scored a total of 20 runs across his two first-class matches, with a highest score of 12. By 1886, he was the vicar of Humberstone near Leicester. He was a passenger aboard the SS Oregon in March 1886, along with his wife and son, when it collided with an unidentified schooner 32 miles from Jones Inlet, New York. While making it to a lifeboat he became ill, fell overboard and drowned.

References

External links

1832 births
1886 deaths
People from Suffolk Coastal (district)
People educated at Marlborough College
Alumni of Emmanuel College, Cambridge
English cricketers
Surrey Club cricketers
19th-century English Anglican priests
Deaths by drowning
Deaths due to shipwreck at sea